Linus Pettersson (born 13 May 1987) is a Swedish bandy player who currently plays for Sandvikens AIK as a defender.

Career

Club career
Pettersson is a youth product of IFK Motala and has represented Sandviken and Zorky.

International career
Pettersson was part of Swedish World Champions teams of 2010, 2012, and 2017.

Honours

Country
 Sweden
 Bandy World Championship: 2010, 2012, 2017

References

External links
 
 

1987 births
Living people
Swedish bandy players
Sandvikens AIK players
Expatriate bandy players in Russia
Zorky Krasnogorsk players
Sweden international bandy players
Bandy World Championship-winning players